Adele Goldberg (born July 22, 1945) is an American computer scientist. She was one of the co-developers of the programming language Smalltalk-80 and of various concepts related to object-oriented programming while a researcher at the Xerox Palo Alto Research Center (PARC), in the 1970s.

Early life and education
Goldberg was born in Cleveland, Ohio, on July 22, 1945.  Her parents moved to Chicago, Illinois when she was 11, where she spent the rest of her childhood. She enjoyed problem solving and mathematics from a young age and was encouraged by her teachers to pursue mathematics. In 1967, she earned a bachelor's degree in mathematics at the University of Michigan.  Interested in the subject of computing, Goldberg worked as an intern with IBM during the summer of her junior year of college, where she learned how to program unit record machines.  After graduating, she attended the University of Chicago, where she received her master's degree (in 1969) and a PhD (in 1973) in information science. She completed her dissertation, "Computer-Assisted Instruction: The Application of Theorem-proving to Adaptive Response Analysis," while working as a research associate at Stanford University. She also served as a visiting researcher at Stanford.

Career
Goldberg began working at PARC in 1973 as a laboratory and research assistant, and eventually became manager of the System Concepts Laboratory where she, Alan Kay, and other researchers developed the programming language Smalltalk-80. This language developed the object-oriented approach of Simula 67 and introduced a programming environment of overlapping windows on graphic display screens. Smalltalk's innovative format was simple to use and customizable. Objects could be transferred among applications with minimal effort. Goldberg and Kay were involved in the development of design templates, forerunners of the design patterns later used in software design.

Along with Kay, she wrote the influential article "Personal Dynamic Media", which predicted a world in which ordinary individuals would use notebook computers to exchange, modify, and redistribute personal media. This paper outlined the vision for the Dynabook.

Many of the concepts developed by Goldberg and her team at PARC became the basis for graphical user interfaces. According to Goldberg, Steve Jobs demanded a demonstration of the Smalltalk System, which she at first refused to give him, although her superiors eventually compelled her to comply. Apple eventually took many of the ideas used in the Xerox Alto and their implementations and used them as the basis for their Apple Macintosh desktop environment.

In 1988, Goldberg left PARC to cofound ParcPlace Systems, a company that created development tools for Smalltalk-based applications. There, she served as chairwoman and CEO until its 1995 merger with Digitalk. She also cofounded Neometron, Inc. an Internet support provider in 1999. She works at Bullitics. She continues to pursue her interest in education, formulating computer science courses at community colleges in the United States and abroad. She is a board member and adviser at Cognito Learning Media, a provider of multimedia software for science education.

Achievements and accolades

Goldberg has been awarded a number of awards and honors for her contributions to the development of computer systems. She was president of the Association for Computing Machinery (ACM) from 1984 to 1986, and, with Alan Kay and Dan Ingalls, received the ACM Software Systems Award in 1987. She was included in Forbes's "Twenty Who Matter". In 1994, she was inducted as a Fellow of the ACM.  She received PC Magazine's Lifetime Achievement Award in 1996.  She was co-awarded the Dr. Dobb's Excellence in Programming Award with Dan Ingalls in 2002. In 2010, she was admitted into the Women in Technology International (WITI) Hall of Fame. She was awarded an honorary doctorate by the Open University.

The Computer History Museum (CHM) houses a collection of Goldberg's working documents, reports, publications and videotapes related to her work on the development of Smalltalk. In 2022, with Dan Ingalls, she was made a Fellow of the CHM for promoting and codeveloping the Smalltalk programming environment and contributions advancing use of computers in education.

Selected publications 
 (out of print; the blue book as known by Smalltalk people)
 (the orange book)
 (the purple book, a revision of the blue book)

References

External links 

  hosted by the Computer History Museum
 Some of Goldberg's publications at ResearchGate

1945 births
20th-century American non-fiction writers
20th-century American scientists
20th-century American women writers
20th-century American women scientists
20th-century American Jews
21st-century American Jews
21st-century American scientists
21st-century American women writers
21st-century American women scientists
American computer scientists
Jewish women scientists
Jewish scientists
American technology writers
American women computer scientists
Engineers from Illinois
Engineers from Ohio
Fellows of the Association for Computing Machinery
Living people
Presidents of the Association for Computing Machinery
Scientists at PARC (company)
Scientists from California
Scientists from Chicago
Scientists from Cleveland
University of Michigan College of Literature, Science, and the Arts alumni
Women technology writers